The 1940 Chico State Wildcats football team represented Chico State College—now known as California State University, Chico—as a member of the Far Western Conference (FWC) during the 1940 college football season. Led by second-year head coach Roy Bohler, Chico State compiled an overall record of 3–3–1 with a mark of 1–2 in conference play, placing third in the FWC. The team was outscored by its opponents 65 to 44 for the season. The Wildcats played home games at College Field in Chico, California.

Schedule

References

Chico State
Chico State Wildcats football seasons
Chico State Wildcats football